The 70-210mm lens is a telephoto zoom lens made by Nikon. The lens has an F-mount to work with all compatible Nikon SLRs and DSLRs.

As opposed to the various f/2.8 versions of the 70-210 Focal length, the f/4 and slower versions of such lenses are marketed to amateurs, accounting for their price.

However, the Nikkor AF 70-210 f/4 variant is a two-touch system (dedicated focus and zoom rings), compared to the rest of the lens range, which utilizes a one-touch (push-pull) system for focusing and zooming.

The lens comes in five different versions.
 4.5-5.6
 4 Series E
 4 AF
 4-5.6 AF
 4-5.6 AF-D

Specifications

See also
Nikon F 80-200mm lens
Canon EF 70–210mm lens

References

External links 
 Unofficial Nikon Archive by Photography in Malaysia

Nikon F-mount lenses